The National Council of Women of Queensland is an umbrella organisation in Queensland, Australia. It unites other organisations with humanitarian and educational objectives for women and is non-party-political, non-sectarian, and not-for-profit. It is affiliated with the National Council of Women of Australia and the International Council of Women.

History 
Inspired by the creation of the International Council of Women in Washington, USA in 1888, a number of similar organisations were established in the various Australian states. The National Council of Women of Queensland was established in 1905 with 21 member organisations. Mrs J.T. Bell was the first president.

Notable members 
 Freda Bage, biologist and first Head of the Women's College at the University of Queensland
 Phyllis Cilento, medical practitioner and journalist, specialising in the health of mothers and children 
 Christina Jane Corrie, suffragist  
 Zina Cumbrae-Stewart, philanthropic volunteer 
 Irene Longman, first woman elected to the Queensland Legislative Assembly

References

Organisations based in Queensland
Women's organisations based in Australia